Strączno  is a village in the administrative district of Gmina Wałcz, within Wałcz County, West Pomeranian Voivodeship, in north-western Poland.

Notable residents
 Herbert Schröder-Stranz (1884–1912), German arctic explorer

References

Villages in Wałcz County